Fehendhoo (Dhivehi: ފެހެންދޫ) is one of the inhabited islands of Southern Maalhosmadulhu Atoll, code letter "Baa" in the Dhivehi alphabet and code letter "F-15" in English.

Geography

Horsburgh Atoll
This atoll is a separate atoll along with Goidhu Island et Fulhadhu. Goidhoo Atoll, (also Goidu or Goifulhafehendhu), appears as Horsburgh Atoll in the Admiralty Chart is separated from South Maalhosmadulhu by a 6-mile broad channel. This atoll is oval in shape and small, its greatest length being 10 miles. The inner lagoon has a depth of 17 to 20 fathoms; it has a sandy bottom mixed with mud and clay. Unlike the lagoons of most small atolls of the Maldives, this lagoon is free from coral heads in its centre.

In the Admiralty Charts, this atoll is named after James Horsburgh, hydrographer to the East India Company and author of the "Directions for Sailing to and from the East Indies, China, New Holland, Cape of Good Hope, and the interjacent Ports, compiled chiefly from original Journals and Observations made during 21 years' experience in navigating those Seas".

Demography

See also
James Horsburgh
 Reethi Beach

References

 Divehiraajjege Jōgrafīge Vanavaru. Muhammadu Ibrahim Lutfee. G.Sōsanī.
 Xavier Romero-Frias. The Maldive Islanders, A Study of the Popular Culture of an Ancient Ocean Kingdom. Barcelona 1999.

Islands of the Maldives